The 2019 Armagh Senior Football Championship is the 119th edition of Armagh GAA's premier gaelic football tournament for senior clubs in County Armagh, Northern Ireland. The winners represent Armagh in the Ulster Senior Club Football Championship.

The championship begins with sixteen teams competing in four groups of four teams before proceeding to a knock-out format with the overall winners receiving the Gerry Fegan Cup.

Crossmaglen Rangers were the defending champions after they defeated Ballymacnab in the 2018 final. They successfully defended their title when defeating the same opposition in the final on 20 October at the Athletic Grounds to claim their record 45th title.

This was St. Peter's Lurgan's and Cullaville Blues' return to the senior grade after they claimed the 2017 I.F.C./I.A.F.L. titles and second in I.A.F.L., respectively.

High Moss Sarsfields and Cullaville Blues were relegated to the I.F.C. and I.A.F.L. for 2020 after they finished seventh and eighth in the S.B.F.L. respectively. They will be replaced by the I.F.C. champions Grange St. Colmcille's as well as I.A.F.L. champions Mullaghbawn Cuchulainn's.

Team Changes

The following teams have changed division since the 2019 championship season.

Promoted To S.F.C. from I.F.C.

 St. Peter's Lurgan  -  (IFC & IAFL Champions)
 Cullaville Blues - (2nd IAFL)

Relegated to I.F.C. from S.F.C.

 Whitecross St. Killian's - (7th SBFL)
 Tír na nÓg Portadown - (8th SBFL)

Group stage
All 16 teams enter the competition at this stage. The top 2 teams in each group go into the quarter-finals while the bottom team of each group enter the relegation playoffs. The team named first in each round listed below received home advantage.

Group A

Round 1
 Sarsfields 2-8, 2-17 Ballymacnab, 16/8/2019,
 Clann Éireann 0-9, 3-18 Crossmaglen Rangers, 17/8/2019,

Round 2
 Ballymacnab 5-20, 0-10 Clann Éireann, 23/8/2019,
 Crossmaglen Rangers 2-18, 3-11 Sarsfields, 25/8/2019,

Round 3
 Crossmaglen Rangers 3-15, 2-12 Ballymacnab, 8/9/2019,
 Clann Éireann 1-19, 2-16 Sarsfields, 8/9/2019,

Group B

Round 1
 St. Peter's 0-6, 2-13 Silverbridge, 17/8/2019,
 Granemore 0-15, 1-11 Armagh Harps, 17/8/2019,

Round 2
 Silverbridge 0-14, 1-12 Granemore, 23/8/2019,
 St. Peter's 1-8, 0-19 Armagh Harps, 24/8/2019,

Round 3
 Armagh Harps 4-8, 1-19 Silverbridge, 8/9/2019,
 Granemore 1-9, 0-7 St. Peter's, 8/9/2019,

Group C

Round 1
 Annaghmore 1-6, 0-12 Dromintee, 16/8/2019,
 Madden 1-9, 0-6 Maghery, 17/8/2019,

Round 2
 Annaghmore 0-8, 0-12 Maghery, 23/8/2019,
 Dromintee 1-14, 0-11 Madden, 24/8/2019,

Round 3
 Maghery 4-11, 0-8 Dromintee, 7/9/2019,
 Madden 1-16, 1-11 Annaghmore, 7/9/2019,

Group D

Round 1
 Cullaville Blues 0-8, 1-11 Cullyhanna, 16/8/2019,
 Pearse Óg 0-11, 0-9 Killeavy, 19/8/2019,

Round 2
 Cullyhanna 0-14, 3-13 Pearse Óg, 25/8/2019,
 Cullaville Blues 1-10, 6-13 Killeavy, 26/8/2019,

Round 3
 Killeavy 1-5, 1-12 Cullyhanna, 7/9/2019,
 Pearse Óg 4-18, 2-11 Cullaville Blues, 7/9/2019,

Knock-Out Stage

Last Eight

Quarter-finals

Semi-finals

Final

All-Ireland Senior Club Football Championship

References

External links

Armagh Senior Football Championship
Armagh Senior Football Championship
Armagh SFC